Francis Maurice (born 25 December 1969) is a Saint Lucian cricketer. He played in six first-class and eight List A matches for the Windward Islands from 1984 to 1993.

See also
 List of Windward Islands first-class cricketers

References

External links
 

1969 births
Living people
Saint Lucian cricketers
Windward Islands cricketers